A leister is a type of spear used for spearfishing.

Leisters are three-pronged with backward-facing barbs, historically often built using materials such as bone and ivory, with tools such as the saw-knife.  In many cases it could be disassembled into a harpoon allowing for greater functionality.

Leisters have been used by hunter-gatherer cultures throughout the world since the Stone Age and are still used for fishing by indigenous tribes and cultures today.

See also 
 Fishing
 Kakivak
 Trident

References

External links 

Spears
Fishing equipment